William Donald McNeill (April 30, 1918 – November 28, 1996) was an American tennis player. He was born in Chickasha, Oklahoma and died in Vero Beach, Florida.

Biography
Don McNeill graduated from Kenyon College in 1940, where he became a member of Delta Kappa Epsilon.

McNeill won his first major title in 1938 when he defeated Frank Bowden at the U.S. National Indoor Tennis Championships, played at the Seventh Regiment Armory in Manhattan, New York.

In 1939, McNeill became the second American to win the French Championships singles title (after Don Budge) when he defeated compatriot Bobby Riggs in the final in straight sets. Afterwards he played at Wimbledon, the only time he participated, and lost to Franjo Kukuljevic in the second round of the singles, reached the third round in the doubles and the quarterfinal in the mixed doubles. He won the All England Plate, a tennis competition held at the Wimbledon Championships, which consisted of players who were defeated in the first or second rounds of the singles competition.

In June 1940, McNeill beat Bobby Riggs to win the singles title at the U.S. Men's Clay Court Championships in Chicago. In August that year he also won the Southampton Invitational tournament after a victory in the final over Frank Kovacs. His run continued two weeks later when he won the invitational tournament at the Newport Casino. In September he won his second Grand Slam title when he defeated Riggs in the final of the U.S. National Championships after being down two sets to love. There were several bad line calls that went against Riggs in this match.   McNeill was the third player who managed to overcome a two-set deficit in the final of the U.S. Championships after Maurice McLoughlin (1912) and Bill Tilden (1922).

His title wins in 1940 earned McNeill the No. 1 ranking in the U.S. at the end of the year. There were no "official" amateur rankings during World War II - McNeill reached as high as World No. 7 in Gordon Lowe's amateur rankings list in 1939. During the war McNeill served as a lieutenant in the U.S. Navy and was attached to the embassy in Buenos Aires, Argentina. While stationed there he won the Argentinian Championships in 1942 and defended the title successfully in November 1943, defeating Pancho Segura in the final.

After the war, McNeill focused on his business career and played tournaments less frequently. In 1950, McNeill won his second U.S. Indoor title, 12 years after winning his first, defeating Fred Kovaleski in four sets. Additionally he had been a runner-up in 1940 and 1946. Both Allison Danzig, in a New York Times article in 1936, and Pancho Segura, in a telephone interview in 2014, described McNeill's game as consisting of very heavily topspun drives off both wings, and Segura was of the opinion that McNeill didn't turn pro because there was really very little money in professional tennis then.

He was elected to the International Tennis Hall of Fame in 1965.

After his tennis career, he became an advertising executive in New York. McNeill died on November 28, 1996 in Vero Beach, Florida due to complications from pneumonia.

Grand Slam finals

Singles: 2 (2 titles)

Doubles: 3 (2 titles, 1 runner-up)

Mixed: 1 (1 runner-up)

References

External links
 
 

1918 births
1996 deaths
American male tennis players
French Championships (tennis) champions
Kenyon College alumni
People from Chickasha, Oklahoma
International Tennis Hall of Fame inductees
Tennis people from Oklahoma
United States National champions (tennis)
Grand Slam (tennis) champions in men's singles
Grand Slam (tennis) champions in men's doubles
College men's tennis players in the United States